Zielenice may refer to the following places in Poland:
Zielenice, Lower Silesian Voivodeship (south-west Poland)
Zielenice, Lesser Poland Voivodeship (south Poland)